Michael James Grosso (born July 23, 1947, in Raritan, New Jersey) is an American former basketball player.

Career
Grosso played for the Pittsburgh Condors of the American Basketball Association in the 1971–72 season. Previously, he had been drafted by the Philadelphia 76ers in the third round of the 1969 NBA Draft, the Kentucky Colonels in the 1969 ABA Draft and the Milwaukee Bucks in the fifth round of the 1970 NBA Draft.

After the Pittsburgh Condors disbanded following the 1971–72 ABA season, Grosso was taken by the Carolina Cougars in the 1972 ABA Dispersal Draft, but the Cougars did not sign him.

Grosso played at the collegiate level at the University of Louisville. He had been recruited by Frank McGuire at the University of South Carolina, but was denied admission by the ACC.

References

1947 births
Living people
American men's basketball players
Basketball players from New Jersey
Louisville Cardinals men's basketball players
Milwaukee Bucks draft picks
People from Raritan, New Jersey
Philadelphia 76ers draft picks
Pittsburgh Condors players
Sportspeople from Somerset County, New Jersey